Electrona is a rural residential locality in the local government area (LGA) of Kingborough in the Hobart LGA region of Tasmania. The 2016 census recorded a population of 364 for the state suburb of Electrona.
It is a small residential area on the d'Entrecasteaux Channel in  Southern Tasmania. It grew up around the Electrona Carbide Works which were established in 1909.

History
Electrona was gazetted as a locality in 1965. It is believed that the name was derived from the fact that a company making carbide, the first electrolytic industry in Tasmania, was on this site.

Around 1908, James Gillies began negotiations with the State government to permit the construction of a Hydroelectric Power Scheme at Tasmania's Great Lake, for the purpose of providing power for his newly patented zinc smelting process and a calcium carbide factory. Construction of the factory commenced in the vicinity of Snug, Tasmania in 1917, and shortly after the end of World War One the Electrona Carbide Works began production of "carbide" using lime (from limestone), coke and electric arc furnaces. The carbide was used in the manufacture of acetylene gas. Gillies chose the name Electrona because of the electricity and electrodes used for smelting.

At the peak of production in the 1960s, the Works employed around 250 people. However, Gillies was unable to obtain sufficient liquidity to finish all of his planned electrification projects and, on the verge of bankruptcy, he lost control of the hydroelectric scheme to the Hydro Electric Department, a State Government department formed for the purpose of rescuing his scheme. The Hydro Electric Department later became the Hydro Electric Commission, then Hydro Tasmania. (The zinc smelter project was abandoned but later taken up again by another company and is currently operated by Zinifex at Lutana, Tasmania.) In 1924 Gillies went into receivership and the Carbide Works was taken over by "the Hydro", and later by Electrona Carbide Industries Pty Ltd, who continued to operate it as such into the 1980s.

The Works were badly hit by the 1967 bush fires and with falling demand for carbide and multimillion-dollar losses from plant failure in 1979, the carbide smelter was sold to Pioneer Silicon Industries Pty Ltd. This company converted it to a silicon smelter with a theoretical capacity of 10,000 tonnes/yr, and produced metallurgical grade silicon "metal" from 1988. However, it was never able to make a profit
 and in August 1991, the plant was finally closed.

Geography
The waters of North-West Bay form the eastern boundary.

Road infrastructure 
Route B68 (Channel Highway) runs through from north to south.

Modern day
Electrona is currently home to some light industries and the residential area of Peggy's Beach.

References

Southern Tasmania
Towns in Tasmania
Localities of Kingborough Council